Periclepsis is a genus of moths belonging to the subfamily Tortricinae of the family Tortricidae.

Species
Periclepsis accinctana (Chretien, 1915)
Periclepsis cinctana ([Denis & Schiffermuller], 1775)

See also
List of Tortricidae genera

References

External links
tortricidae.com

Archipini
Tortricidae genera